Ernest I of Brunswick-Grubenhagen (– 9 March 1361) was Prince of Brunswick-Grubenhagen.

Life 
He was the son of Henry I, the Admirable and his wife Agnes, née Countess of Meissen.  Henry the Admirable founded the Principality of Grubenhagen in 1291, after the Guelph princes had divided their inheritance.  Ernest originally intended to follow a spiritual career, but after his father's death, he and his brothers Henry II and William jointly ruled the principality.

Grubenhagen was rather smaller than the other Guelph principalities.  Because Henry the Admirable had many children (eight sons and eight daughters), it was difficult to supply all the descendants in style.  His eldest son Henry II could therefore not take the undivided sovereignty over the principality.  In 1324, Henry concluded an extensive pact with his brothers Ernest and William under which the territory should be governed jointly, but shortly afterwards the principality was divided.  Ernest received the area around Einbeck, Grubenhagen Castle and Osterode.  The towns of Duderstadt, Osterode and Einbeck were ruled jointly. In 1359 he made his son Albert I co-regent.  His older brother Henry died 1351 and his sons lingered abroad and died without issue, so after the death of his childless younger brother William in 1360, Ernest ruled the entire principality of Grubenhagen.  After his death, on 9 March 1361, he was succeeded by his son Albert I.

Marriage and issue 
Ernst married in June 1335 Adelheid of Everstein-Polle (died after 29 September 1373), daughter of Count Henry II of Eberstein.  The marriage produced nine children.
 Otto (born 1337, died young)
 Albert I (born: c. 1339; died 1383)
 married in 1372 Agnes of Brunswick (d. 1410), daughter of Duke Magnus II of Brunswick.
 John II (died 1401), canon in Hildesheim, Einbeck and Mainz.
 Adelheid (born: c. 1341; died 1406)
 married (circa 1362) Duke Bogislaw V of Pomerania (born: circa 1326; died 1374)
 Agnes (born: c. 1342; died 1394)
 married in 1362 Count Ulrich of Hohnstein
 Anna (born: c. 1343; died 1409)
 married in 1362 Count Henry VIII of Hohnstein
 Ernest (born: c. 1346; died 1400/02), abbot of Corvey (1369–1371)
 Frederick (born: c. 1350; died 1421)
 married Adelheid of Anhalt
 Anna (born: c. 1360; died 1437), Abbess in Osterode

Further reading 
 
 Paul Zimmermann: Das Haus Braunschweig-Grubenhagen. Wolfenbüttel, 1911

Princes of Grubenhagen
1297 births
1361 deaths
Year of birth uncertain
Old House of Brunswick